Saleem Abdulrauf is an American physician specializing in neurosurgery in St. Louis, Missouri, who has helped develop high-flow brain bypass surgery, a less invasive procedure for treating intracranial aneurysm than methods used previously.

He is the Neurosurgeon-in-Chief at the Abdulrauf Institute of Neurosurgery. He is the Founding Professor and Chairman of the Department of Neurological Surgery at Saint Louis University School of Medicine and Director of the Center for Cerebrovascular and Skull Base Surgery at Saint Louis University Hospital in Saint Louis, Missouri.

He has served as a visiting professor to over 100 universities around the globe. He has authored the main reference textbook for brain bypass surgery titled Cerebral Revascularization in which Abdulrauf details extra-cranial to intracranial bypass surgery.

He is considered the world authority on "Awake" surgery for Brain Aneurysms, Arterio-venous-Malformations (AVMs), and EC-IC Bypass.

Abdulrauf has served on the boards of multiple neurosurgical societies, including the Congress of Neurological Surgeons (CNS) and the World Federation of Skull Base Societies (WFSBS).

He is the Global President of the Walter E. Dandy Neurosurgical Society Walter E. Dandy Neurosurgical Society

The Abdulrauf University of Neurosurgery, the first university of neurosurgery was named after him.

He is the author of the non-fiction book Three Invaders

Biography
Abdulrauf attended a high school in Kansas City, Missouri, and received his bachelor of arts in biology from Washington University in St. Louis, Missouri. He attended medical school at Saint Louis University School of Medicine, where he received the M.D. degree. He completed post-graduate training and a residency in neurosurgery at Henry Ford Hospital in Detroit, Michigan and subsequently completed a fellow in Cerebrovascular Neurosurgery at Yale University, where he was on faculty in the Department of Neurosurgery.  Abdulrauf completed a fellowship in skull base neurosurgery at the University of Arkansas School of Medicine in Little Rock, Arkansas, training under M. Gazi Yasargil, who developed brain bypass surgery in the 1960s in Switzerland and is considered the father of modern neurosurgery.

Abdulrauf has played a role in the development and education of a new brain bypass technique, now known as the Abdulrauf bypass.  In 2010 Abdulrauf performed the first high-flow bypass operation on a giant brain aneurysm in a blood vessel at the base of the skull of a 51-year-old woman.  This less-invasive technique, which requires a much smaller incision, promotes better blood flow and reduces recovery time, was a significant advancement in neurosurgery; it was a cover article in the medical journal Neurosurgery in March 2010. In collaboration with Scanlan International, Abdulrauf also developed the neurosurgical instrument to accommodate the requirements of the Abdulrauf bypass technique.

Selected publications
Abdulrauf write a reference textbook for bypass brain surgery titled Cerebral Revascularization: Techniques in Extracranial-to-Intracranial Bypass Surgery: Expert Consult, and is an editor on the third edition of Principles of Neurosurgery. Publications include:

 Ellenbogen RG and Abdulrauf SI, Editors. Principles of Neurosurgery, Third Edition. Copyright 2010 Elsevier, Inc. .
 Abdulrauf SI, Editor. Cerebral Revascularization: Techniques in Extracranial to Intracranial Bypass Surgery. Copyright 2011 Elsevier, Inc. .
 Abdulrauf SI. Extracranial-to-intracranial bypass using radial artery grafting for complex skull base tumors: Technical note. Skull Base: An Interdisciplinary Approach 15,3:207-213, 2005.
 Yasargil MG and Abdulrauf SI. Surgery of intraventricular tumors. 30th Anniversary Human Cerebrum III Issue. Neurosurgery June 2008;62(6)SHC1029-40.
 Coppens JR, Cantando JD, and Abdulrauf SI. Minimally invasive awake STA to MCA bypass through a large burr hole: The use of CT angiography neuronavigation in surgical planning: Technical note. Journal of Neurosurgery September 2008; 109(3) 553–8.
 Mahaney KM and Abdulrauf SI. Anatomical relationship of the optic radiations to the atrium of the lateral ventricle: Description of a novel entry point to the trigone. Neurosurgery October 2008; 63.
 Abdulrauf SI, Sweeney JM, Mohan YS, and Palejwala SK. Short segment internal maxillary artery to middle cerebral artery: A novel technique for extracranial-to-intracranial bypass. NeurosurgeryMarch 2011, 68(3);804-8.

References

Year of birth missing (living people)
Living people
American neurosurgeons